Si Wilai is a district (amphoe) in the eastern part of Bueng Kan province, northeastern Thailand.

Geography
Neighboring districts are (from the north clockwise): Mueang Bueng Kan, Seka, and Phon Charoen. Phu Thok, the emblematic mountain of the province, is in this district.

History
The minor district (king amphoe) Si Wilai was established on 1 January 1988, when four tambons, Si Wilai, Chumphu Phon, Na Saeng, and Na Sabaeng were split off from Bueng Kan district. It was upgraded to a full district on 4 July 1994.

Administration
The district is divided into five sub-districts (tambons), which are further subdivided into 50 villages (mubans). The sub-district municipality (thesaban tambon) Si Wilai covers the whole tambon Si Wilai. There are a further four tambon administrative organizations (TAO).

References

External links
amphoe.com

 
Districts of Bueng Kan province